is a Japanese anime director and storyboard artist. He is on general staff at Studio Comet, and handles production and directing jobs.

Works
Credits are as director unless otherwise indicated.
Ashita Tenki ni Naare (TV series, production)
Ask Dr. Rin! (TV series; Director)
Capeta (TV series; Director)
Chikyū SOS Sore Ike Kororin (TV series, storyboards)
DT Eightron (TV series)
Fire Emblem (OVA; Director, Storyboard, Production Design)
Geobreeders: Breakthrough (OVA; series director, storyboards)
Gingitsune (TV series; Director, Storyboard (eps. 1, 7, 12), Episode Director (ep. 12))
High School! Kimengumi (movie; Director (part 2))
High School Mystery: Gakuen Nanafushigi (TV series; director, storyboards (ep.11))
Initial D (TV series; (1st stage, extra stage) Director, Storyboard (eps 1–2, 4–5), Episode Director (ep 1))
Kochira Katsushika-ku Kameari Kōen-mae Hashutsujo (TV series; Director)
Meimon! Dai-san Yakyūbu (TV series, production)
Shin Megami Tensei: D Children Light & Dark (TV series (2002); Director (eps 27-52), Storyboard (ep 52))
Tsuyoshi Shikkari Shinasai (TV series; Director, Storyboard, Episode Director)

References

External links
 
 

Anime directors
Living people
Year of birth missing (living people)